The Electricsports ES-Trike is a German electric-powered ultralight trike produced by Electricsports GmbH of Ostrach. The aircraft is supplied complete and ready-to-fly.

The design is a collaboration between Wolfgang Zanki, who specializes in carbon fibre composites, Toni Roth, who builds electric-powered harnesses and Meinrad Reisch, who builds electric paramotors.

Design and development
In its single seat model, the ES-Trike was designed to comply with the Fédération Aéronautique Internationale microlight category, the German 120 kg class and the US FAR 103 Ultralight Vehicles rules.

The aircraft design features a cable-braced hang glider-style high-wing, weight-shift controls, a single-seat open cockpit with a cockpit fairing, tricycle landing gear and a single piston engine or electric motor in pusher configuration.

The airframe is made from carbon fibre and titanium, with its single or double surface wing covered in Dacron sailcloth. The wing is supported by a single tube-type kingpost and uses an "A" frame weight-shift control bar. The automatically folding carbon fibre propeller is mounted on a  shaft to allow it to operate in less-disturbed air.

A number of different wings can be fitted to the basic carriage, including single and double surface wings. The aircraft's performance depends greatly on the wing that is selected.

Variants
ES-Trike Mono
Base model with one seat.
ES-Trike Duo
Model with two seats.

Specifications (ES-Trike Mono)

References

External links

ES-Trike
2010s German sport aircraft
2010s German ultralight aircraft
Single-engined pusher aircraft
Electric aircraft
Ultralight trikes